The Iran Insurance embezzlement case refers to an embezzlement scandal within the state-owned Iran Insurance Company, publicized in November 2010. Key figures behind the scandal included a clique of statesmen within the government of Mahmoud Ahmadinejad, known as the Fatemi Circle. The case was controversially appealed at the same time with 2011 Iranian embezzlement scandal.

Convicted people

2014 
On 24 August 2014, the fate of the 12 suspects were decided.

2015 
Former First Vice President of Iran, Mohammad-Reza Rahimi was convicted of "Illegal acquisition of illicit property" and accepting bribes and was sentenced to 5 years and 91 days in prison, ordered to return 8,500,000,000 rials and fined 10,000,000,000 rials.

References 

Corruption in Iran
Scandals in Iran